= Sterling Nature Center =

Nature preserve in New York state, US

Coordinates: 43.3748°N 76.6506°W

Sterling Nature Center is a 1,428-acre nature preserve located in the northeastern corner of Cayuga County in the town of Sterling. The center's mission is to manage the areas natural resources and to promote an understanding and appreciation for the natural world.

The nature center is open every day from dawn to dusk and admission is free.

The center features approximately 10 miles of well-marked trails and two miles of Lake Ontario shoreline. During the winter season, the trails remain open to cross country skiing, snow shoeing, and hiking. There are designated trails for snowmobiling as well. Dogs are permitted on the grounds but must be kept on a leash, and animal waste must be removed. Swimming, hunting, and camping are prohibited within the nature center.
